Volrath Vogt (14 February 1817 – 19 July 1889) was a Danish-born, Norwegian theologian, educator and author.  
Today he is most  known for his biblical stories for schoolchildren.

Vogt was born in the village of Reerslev near Roskilde,  Denmark.  He was the son of Johan Nilsen Vogt (1783–1859) and Henriette Elisabeth Lorenzina Juhl (1790–1846). He grew up at Tune in Christiania (modern Oslo), Norway, where his father was a Church of Norway vicar and later provost.  He earned his cand.theol. in 1838.

He was a teacher at the Christiania Cathedral School for fifty years (1839 to 1889). Vogt taught in religion, geography and the French language. In 1863 he conducted an extended research trip to Syria and Palestine, where he gathered impressions and historical data. He published a number of popular  works of the Gospels, a textbook in Church history and various textbooks on Bible history. His textbook Bibelhistorie med Lidt af Kirkens Historie from 1858 became widely used in schools, and had been printed in more than a million copies at the time of his death.

Selected works
Udtog af Kirkehistorien nærmest til Brug ved de lærde Skoler – 1843
Forklaring af Matthæi Evangelium til Skolebrug – 1849 
Forklaring af Johannes's Evangelium til Skolebrug – 1856
Bibelhistorie med Lidt af Kirkens Historie – 1858
Bibelhistorie med Beskrivelse af det Hellige Land for Borger- og høiere Almueskoler – 1862 
Forklaring af Luthers lille Katekismus, efter Pontoppidan- 1865 
Kirkehistorie til Skolebrug – 1865 
Reise i det Hellige Land og Syrien, tilleggshefte til Folkevennen – 1865
Det Hellige Land – 1868 
Mattæus' Evangelium i ændret Oversættelse med Anmærkninger – 1884
Stykker af 12 Kapitler af første Mosebog, i ændret Oversættelse med Anmærkninger – 1886

References

1817 births
1889 deaths
Danish emigrants to Norway
Norwegian theologians
Norwegian schoolteachers
19th-century Norwegian writers
People from Høje-Taastrup Municipality
19th-century Lutherans